Our Streets Turn White is the second EP released by Australian Hardcore band Mary Jane Kelly. The album was released in 2008 featuring a remake of "Worthwhile Overdose" heard on their previous album Marionettes.

Track listing
 "Intro" - 0:58  
 "Sinking Ships To Burning Cars" - 3:34   
 "Folding Seas And Lonely Deaths" - 3:17   
 "Worthwhile Overdose" - 3:01   
 "Our Streets Turn White" - 2:53   
 "I Stabbed God In The Back" - 3:16

Credits
Justin Bortignon - vocals (2006–present)	
Matt Velozo - guitar (2006–present)
Jamal Salem - drums (2006–present)
Sam Kost - bass (2009–present)
Shane Edwards - Producer

References

2008 EPs
Mary Jane Kelly (band) EPs